Eliot Shorr-Parks (born November 2, 1986) is an American journalist, author and sports radio personality for 94.1 WIP in Philadelphia. He is WIP's beat reporter for the Philadelphia Eagles. Prior to joining WIP, Shorr-Parks was the Eagles beat reporter for NJ.com.

Early life
Shorr-Parks was born on November 2, 1986, and grew up in Philadelphia. His father Steven Parks is a writing professor at Syracuse University and his mother is a writer. Shorr-Parks graduated from Central High School in Philadelphia. He attended Juniata College from 2006 to 2008, but transferred to Temple University and graduated with a degree in broadcast journalism in 2011.

Career
After graduating from Temple, Shorr-Parks worked as an intern for Gcobb.com, which allowed him to begin covering the Eagles.

Shorr-Parks began covering the Eagles for Daily Local News in 2011. He joined SB Nation the next year as their Eagles beat reporter for Bleeding Green Nation.

In 2012, at age 24, Shorr-Parks published the book More Than a Game: Life Lessons from Philadelphia’s Sports Communities. Written over a period of two and a half years, the book includes more than 30 stories of the impact of sports in Philadelphia. Areas covered in the book are the Sonny Hill Basketball League.

From 2012 until 2018, Shorr-Parks was the Eagles reporter for NJ.com. There he also hosted their Eagle's podcast The No-Huddle Show for three years. In 2014, Shorr-Parks wrote a bombshell article revealing that the Eagles had concerns regarding wide receiver DeSean Jackson and his gang connections. Minutes after the story broke, the Eagles released Jackson.

Shorr-Parks joined 94.1 WIP in 2018 and serves as their beat reporter on the Eagles. He is a frequent contributor to the station's shows. He also hosts Go Birds, an Eagles podcast, and Go Birds Radio, a weekly Saturday Eagles radio. Additionally, Eliot Shorr-Parks hosts The Best Football Show, an Audacy podcast.

References

External links
Official WIP Web Site

1986 births
Living people
American sports radio personalities
Radio personalities from Philadelphia
American journalists